Muito Prazer is a 1979 Brazilian film directed by David Neves.

Cast 
 Ítala Nandi .... Nádia
 Antonio Pedro .... Chico
 Cecil Thiré .... Aquino
 Otávio Augusto .... Ivan
 Vera Barroso
 Carlos Kroeber
 Ângela Leal
 Irving São Paulo

Awards 
1979: Festival de Brasília
Best Picture (won)
Best Actor (Otávio Augusto) (won)
Best Cinematography (Jom Tob Azulay) (won)

References

External links 
 

1979 films
1970s Portuguese-language films
Brazilian comedy films